Knifer ( Macherovgaltis) is a 2010 Greek-Cypriot drama film directed by Yannis Economides. After his father's death, Nikos moves from Ptolemaida to Athens. His uncle offers him food and shelter while he starts taking care of his dogs. Alone in an isolated suburb, he's wearing down into his misery routine, till the moment his relationship with his aunt changes everything.

Cast
 Stathis Stamoulakatos as Nikos
 Vangelis Mourikis as Alekos
 Maria Kallimani as Gogo
 Yannis Voulgarakis as Nikos' friend
 Yannis Anastasakis as Drunk man
 Nikol Drizi as Nikos' girl
 Konstadinos Siradakis as Waiter (as Kostas Syradakis)

References

External links
 

2010 films
2010 drama films
Cypriot drama films
2010s Greek-language films
Greek drama films
Films shot in Athens